Charlie Walker (born 8 March 1990) is an English semi-professional footballer who plays as a striker for  club Eastbourne Borough.

Career

Early career
Walker was born in Brighton, East Sussex. He was spotted playing in the Brighton, Hove & District League by the Sussex County Football Association chairman in 2010, who later became chairman of Sussex County Football League Division One club Shoreham and recommended Walker to the manager. After scoring 15 goals for Shoreham by December 2011, he signed for Lancing, for whom he netted a further 21 goals to help them finish second in the table, which earned him a move to Isthmian League Premier Division club Whitehawk. Walker subsequently signed for neighbours Peacehaven & Telscombe, and finished 2013–14 with 43 goals, as the club won the Isthmian League Division One South title and the Sussex Senior Challenge Cup.

Luton Town
Walker signed for League Two club Luton Town from Peacehaven & Telscombe on 19 July 2014, after being recommended by his former Whitehawk manager Darren Freeman. He debuted in a 2–1 win away to Stevenage on 4 October and made five further appearances for the club. However, it was announced in May 2015 that Walker's contract would not be renewed.

Loan to Boreham Wood
On 20 February 2015, Walker signed for Conference South club Boreham Wood on loan until the end of 2014–15. He scored on his debut a day later with the fourth goal in a 4–1 victory away to Weston-super-Mare. Walker completed the loan spell with one goal from 13 appearances, as the club won promotion to the National League for the first time in their history with a 2–1 victory over his former club Whitehawk in the Conference South play-off final after extra time, in which he was introduced as a substitute for Junior Morais.

Aldershot Town
On 19 June 2015, Walker signed for National League club Aldershot Town on a one-year contract. He debuted on the opening day of 2015–16 in a 2–1 defeat at home to Gateshead and scored his first goal on 29 August in a 2–1 defeat at home to Eastleigh. Walker then scored five goals in four appearances in September to help Aldershot win four out of five matches. A further three goals in five appearances in October took his tally for the season to nine goals. Walker finished his first season at Aldershot as the club's top scorer with 14 goals from 44 appearances, as they finished 15th in the National League. After the end of the season, he signed a new one-year contract.

Walker suffered ankle ligament damage in pre-season ahead of 2016–17, which kept him out for six weeks. He made his first appearance of the season after being introduced as a 71st-minute substitute in a 1–1 draw away to former loan club Boreham Wood on 13 September 2016. His first goal of the season came with the third goal in a 3–0 win at home to Gateshead on 24 September. However, Walker made only four starts for Aldershot and was released by mutual consent on 21 December to find a club where he would play regularly in the first-team.

St Albans City
Walker signed for National League South club St Albans City on a one-and-a-half-year contract on 4 January 2017. After signing, assistant manager Lee Allinson said "He's the all-round striker. Strong, fast, can score great goals and on his day is pretty much unplayable." He debuted three days later in a 2–2 draw at home to Maidenhead United.

Eastbourne Borough
Walker signed for fellow National League South club Eastbourne Borough on 5 June 2018.

Personal life
Prior to becoming a professional footballer with Luton Town, Walker was a self-employed builder.

Career statistics

Honours
Peacehaven & Telscombe
Sussex Senior Challenge Cup: 2013–14
Isthmian League Division One South: 2013–14

Boreham Wood
Conference South play-offs: 2014–15

References

External links
Charlie Walker profile at the Eastbourne Borough F.C. website

1990 births
Living people
Footballers from Brighton
English footballers
Association football forwards
Shoreham F.C. players
Lancing F.C. players
Whitehawk F.C. players
Peacehaven & Telscombe F.C. players
Luton Town F.C. players
Boreham Wood F.C. players
Aldershot Town F.C. players
St Albans City F.C. players
Eastbourne Borough F.C. players
Isthmian League players
English Football League players
National League (English football) players